Futuresport is a 1998 American made-for-television sports film directed by Ernest Dickerson, starring Dean Cain, Vanessa Williams, and Wesley Snipes. It originally aired on ABC in October 1998, and was released on VHS and DVD in March 1999.

Plot
The film is set in 2025, and centers on a sport called "Futuresport" (a combination of basketball, baseball and hockey that uses hoverboards and rollerblades) created as a non-lethal way to reduce gang warfare. Tre Ramzey (Dean Cain) along with his ex-girlfriend Alex Torres (Vanessa Williams) and his old coach Obike Fixx (Wesley Snipes) must prevent an all out war between the North American Alliance and the Pan-Pacific Commonwealth (The Com). At stake is who rules over the Hawaiian Islands—which are being terrorized by Eric Sythe (JR Bourne) and his gang the Hawaiian Liberation Organization (Hilo). It takes a revolutionary sport to stop a revolution.

Cast

 Dean Cain as Treymayne "Tre The Pharaoh" Ramzey
 Vanessa Williams as Alejandra "Alex" Torres
 Wesley Snipes as Obike Fixx
 Mikela Jay as Lorelei
 Bill Smitrovich as Coach Douglas
 Tara Frederick as "Anarchy"
 Valerie Chow as "Jet"
 Brian Jensen as Tom "Mayhem" Mayhew
 Adrian G. Griffiths as Blake Becker
 David Kaye as Ronnie Vance
 Emanuelle Chriqui as Gina Gonzales
 Brad Loree as Roger Willard
 Lloyd Adams as Travis Middlebrooks
 JR Bourne as Eric Sythe
 Francoise Yip as Keahi
 Ken Kirzinger as Jack "Hatchet Jack" Jamiston
 Hiro Kanagawa as Otomo Akira
 Lori Stewart as Carly "Kiwi" Madigan
 Patrick Pfrimmer as Sebastian Krajenski
 Matthew Walker as Neville Hodgkins
 Gerard Plunkett as Edgar Computer Voice

References

External links 
 
 

1998 television films
1998 films
American science fiction television films
Films shot in Vancouver
Films directed by Ernest Dickerson
1990s science fiction films
Films scored by Stewart Copeland
Films about terrorism in the United States
Films set in 2025
Films set in New Orleans
Films set in Los Angeles
Films set in Hawaii
Artificial intelligence in fiction
Robots in television
Politics in fiction
Social reputation in fiction
Sports television films
1990s English-language films
1990s American films